Korporatsioon Sakala (abbreviated Korp! Sakala) is a fraternal organization of Estonian higher education students. It was established at the University of Tartu on November 14, 1909.

The motto of korp! Sakala is One for all, and all for one! Its principles are natio, democratia and fraternitas, which are represented by the colors blue, violet and white as well the main principles of korp! Sakala are national loyalty, patriotism, promoting education, healthy living and physical recreation.  The goal of korp! Sakala is to strengthen the academic bonds and support its members both morally and materially. With its activities Sakala intends to improve Estonia’s self-governance, preserve and advance its culture and to support realization of the ideas of democracy.

Korp! Sakala's convent house is one of the architectural masterpieces in Tartu, planned by renowned Finnish national architect's Armas Lindgren and Wivi Lönn and completed in 1911. The high ceilings, prominent hall and plenty of space make it ideal for a student corporation.

In 1941 the building was hit with a flame bomb and the only thing that survived was the walls. During the Second world war it was used as a medical station and command post. After the war ended, the building was given to the Tartu Art School. Forty years later, the house was returned to Sakala by the municipality and with great effort from Sakala's members and support from abroad, it was finally renovated a couple of years later.

During the Soviet annexation of Estonia, korp! Sakala was banned for nearly 50 years. It was officially reinstated with University of Tartu on May 12, 1989.

Friendship organizations
Korp! Sakala has friendship treaties with two student nations, Hämäläis-Osakunta at Helsinki University, signed 1929, and Gästrike-Hälsinge nation at Uppsala University, signed 1939.

See also
List of corporations worldwide
Characterization of German Student Corps

References

External links

1900s establishments in Estonia
Student organizations established in 1909
Fraternities and sororities in Estonia
1909 establishments in the Russian Empire